Emmanuel "Emi" Ochoa (born May 5, 2005) is an American professional soccer player who plays as a goalkeeper for Major League Soccer club San Jose Earthquakes.

Club career
Born in Salinas, California, Ochoa started his career with local side El Camino before joining the Santa Cruz Breakers. He joined the San Jose Earthquakes academy in 2019, before being promoted to the first team ahead of the 2020 season.

Ochoa made national sports headlines in November 2019 when, at only 14 years and 191 days old, he signed as a Homegrown Player for the San Jose Earthquakes, making him the youngest ever Homegrown Player in Major League Soccer history. He is also the second youngest player to register for an MLS team, behind Freddy Adu, and is considered to be the best goalkeeper of his age group in the country.

International career
Ochoa has represented the United States at under-14 and under-15 level. He is also eligible to represent Mexico. On March 9, 2020, Ochoa received a call up to the Mexico U-16 side, his first for any of Mexico's national team squads. He played in a scrimmage match against the youth team of Club Puebla on March 12, 2020.

In August 2021, Ochoa was called up to the Mexico under-18 squad, and made his debut in a 2–1 loss to the Republic of Ireland under-17s.

Personal life
Born in the United States, Ochoa is of Mexican descent.

Career statistics

Club

References

2005 births
Living people
Soccer players from California
American sportspeople of Mexican descent
American soccer players
Mexican footballers
United States men's youth international soccer players
Mexico youth international footballers
Association football goalkeepers
San Jose Earthquakes players
Homegrown Players (MLS)
MLS Next Pro players